The 1973–74 season was Leeds United's tenth consecutive season in the First Division and the second season in which they won the First Division. Along with the First Division, Leeds United competed in the UEFA Cup and the FA Cup during the 1973–74 season. The season covers the period from 1 July 1973 to 30 June 1974.

Season summary 
Having lost in the finals of the Cup Winners Cup and the FA Cup in 1972–73, manager Don Revie considered a move to Everton, but remained with Leeds after the move broke down due to a new law that prevented wage rises to curb inflation. Continuing with what was largely the same squad as during the previous season, he told them his aim was to go unbeaten throughout the season. Leeds started the season well, winning their first 7 league games. This run ended on 22 September when Leeds were held to a 0–0 draw by Manchester United. On 8 October, Leeds were knocked out of the League cup in the Second Round by Ipswich Town. After finding success in the first two rounds of the UEFA Cup, he played weakened teams to allow an early exit from the UEFA Cup, in order to allow his team to focus on the league. Leeds were knocked out in the third round by Vitória FC. At the start of 1974, Leeds were 8 points clear of second placed Liverpool with 19 games remaining and still remaining unbeaten. On 23 February 1974, Leeds lost their first league game, losing 3–2 away to Stoke. Leeds would lose 3 more times in the 1973–74 season, but they won the 1973–74 title going 29 matches unbeaten. This was still a record unbeaten start to a league campaign in the 20th century, and not bettered until Arsenal's 2003–04 campaign. In total Leeds lost just 4 league games and remained in first place for almost the entire campaign. At the end of the season, manager Don Revie left to manage the England national team.

Competitions

First Division

League table

Results by matchday

Results 

Source:

FA Cup 

Source:

League Cup 

Source:

UEFA Cup 

Source:

Notes

References 

Leeds United F.C. seasons
Leeds United
1970s in Leeds
English football championship-winning seasons